Gerstlauer Amusement Rides GmbH is a German manufacturer of stationary and transportable amusement rides and roller coasters, located in Münsterhausen, Germany.

History

In 1982, Hubert Gerstlauer, a former employee of the Anton Schwarzkopf-owned Schwarzkopf Industries GmbH company founded his own company, named Gerstlauer Elektro GmbH.  With this new Gerstlauer-named company, he delivered electric and pneumatic equipment for Schwarzkopf's facilities.  After final bankruptcy of Schwarzkopf Industries GmbH in 1992, Gerstlauer Elektro GmbH acquired part of their production sites and facilities, and continued the manufacture of amusement rides and roller coasters.  In March 2007, Gerstlauer Elektro GmbH was subsequently renamed Gerstlauer Amusement Rides GmbH.

Gerstlauer's first own-designed and manufactured roller coaster, the 'G'sengte Sau', a bobsled roller coaster, was built in Erlebnispark Tripsdrill, an amusement park in Baden-Württemberg, south-eastern Germany.  Since 2003, Gerstlauer became popular with their Euro-Fighter roller coaster, which is present in different styles in Europe and the United States.  A specific design feature of all Euro-Fighter roller coasters is a drop with a 'beyond vertical' angle of more than 90 degrees.  Another model is their spinning roller coaster, in which the riders are seated facing each other.

Gerstlauer also built trains for several wooden roller coasters, though several of which are no longer operating.  Examples of these include The Boss at Six Flags St. Louis, USA.

List of Gerstlauer designed rides

Gerstlauer roller coasters

As of 2022, Gerstlauer Amusement Rides GmbH has built 106 roller coasters around the world.

Other Gerstlauer amusement rides
In addition to roller coasters, Gerstlauer Amusement Rides GmbH has also manufactured a range of flat rides and track rides.

Gallery

References

External links

Gerstlauer-Rides.de — Gerstlauer Amusement Rides GmbH official website

Companies established in 1982
1982 establishments in West Germany
Roller coaster designers
Roller coaster manufacturers
Amusement ride manufacturers
Manufacturing companies of Germany
Günzburg (district)
Companies based in Bavaria